The Medicine Bow Mountains are a mountain range in the Rocky Mountains that extend  from northern Colorado into southern Wyoming. The northern extent of this range is the sub-range the Snowy Range. From the northern end of Colorado's Never Summer Mountains, the Medicine Bow mountains extend north from Cameron Pass along the border between Larimer and Jackson counties in Colorado and northward into south central Wyoming. In Wyoming, the range sits west of Laramie, in Albany and Carbon counties to the route of the Union Pacific Railroad and U.S. Interstate 80. The mountains often serve as a symbol for the city of Laramie. The range is home to Snowy Range Ski Area.

The highest peak in the range is Clark Peak, located in the Rawah Wilderness along the southern end of the range in Northern Colorado. Much of the range is located within the Medicine Bow National Forest in Wyoming. The highest peak on the Wyoming side is Medicine Bow Peak. The range is drained along the western flank by the Michigan and Canadian rivers, tributaries of the North Platte in North Park. On its eastern flank it is drained by the Laramie River, another tributary of the North Platte.

Geology

The Medicine Bow Mountains resulted from continental compression during the Laramide Orogeny.  Beginning about 70 million years ago, the Rockies began uplifting along thrust faults that broke up the Precambrian granite of Earth's crust.  By 50 million years ago, all of Wyoming's major mountain ranges were elevated and the major basins defined.  Rocks exposed along the flanks and peaks of the Medicine Bow Mountains span the Precambrian to modern, with the peaks composed of 2.4-2.0 billion year old Medicine Peak Quartzite.  This rock was once a shallow marine sand deposit that has since been compressed and heated during burial, forming the metamorphic rock, quartzite.  What may be traces of multicellular animals are preserved in this rock, making it of particular interest to paleontologists.

The Cheyenne belt, the 1.78–1.74 billion year old suture between the Wyoming craton and the Yavapai province that formed as North America was assembled, is exposed in the Medicine Bow Mountains.

Fauna
Wildlife abounds in these mountains, with mule deer, elk, moose, black bear, mountain lions, coyotes, marmots, pika, Richardson's ground squirrels, bobcats, and lynx as well as a tremendous variety of birds.  Brook and rainbow trout as well as grayling and golden trout are found in the streams. A disjunct population of arctic fairy shrimp (Brachinecta paludosa) has been documented in a few lakes in the northern part of the range.

Research

Since 1987, the Glacier Lakes area of the Snowy Range has been home to the Glacier Lakes Ecosystem Experiments Site (GLEES), a field unit of the Rocky Mountain Research Station, United States Forest Service. Areas of scientific inquiry at the site include atmospheric pollutant deposition, forest carbon and water vapor cycling, effect of insect outbreaks, and alpine lake and stream hydrology.

Airline crash
This mountain range is also home to some of the remains of a Douglas DC-4 aircraft, operated as United Airlines Flight 409. The aircraft crashed into Medicine Bow Peak on October 6, 1955, killing all 66 people on board.

References

External links
 
Medicine Bow Mountains @ Peakbagger
Medicine Bow Mountains on summitpost.org
Snowy Range info page on summitpost.org
Snowy Range photo album on summitpost.org
Roadless Area Descriptions from Biodiversity Conservation Alliance

Ranges of the Rocky Mountains
Mountain ranges of Colorado
Mountain ranges of Wyoming
Landforms of Larimer County, Colorado
Landforms of Jackson County, Colorado
Landforms of Albany County, Wyoming
Landforms of Carbon County, Wyoming